On May 15, 1820, David Fullerton (DR) of  resigned from his seat in the House of Representatives.  A special election was held on October 10, 1820 to fill the resulting vacancy.  This election was held on the same day as the election for the 17th Congress.

Election results

McCullough took his seat November 13, 1820

See also
List of special elections to the United States House of Representatives

References

Pennsylvania 1820 05
Pennsylvania 1820 05
1820 05
Pennsylvania 05
United States House of Representatives 05
United States House of Representatives 1820 05